The canton of Vouneuil-sous-Biard is an administrative division of the Vienne department, western France. It was created at the French canton reorganisation which came into effect in March 2015. Its seat is in Vouneuil-sous-Biard.

It consists of the following communes:
 
Ayron
Béruges
Boivre-la-Vallée
Chalandray
Chiré-en-Montreuil
Frozes
Latillé
Maillé
Quinçay
Vouillé
Vouneuil-sous-Biard

References

Cantons of Vienne